Tyler D'Whyte Roberts (born 12 January 1999) is a professional footballer who plays as a striker for Premier League club Leeds United, and the Wales national football team.

Roberts is an academy graduate of West Bromwich Albion and made his professional debut for the club in May 2016. Loan spells in League One with Oxford United, Shrewsbury Town and Walsall followed before he joined Leeds in January 2018. In the 2019-2020 season, Roberts was a member of the Leeds United Squad that won the EFL Championship and promotion to the Premier League under manager Marcelo Bielsa. He made his senior Wales debut in 2018, having previously represented the nation at various youth levels, and represented Wales at UEFA Euro 2020. A versatile forward, he can play as a striker, winger or as an attacking midfielder.

Early life
Born in Gloucester to UK-born parents of Jamaican and Welsh descent, Roberts moved to Birmingham aged 11. He attended Sandwell Academy in West Bromwich.

Club career

West Bromwich Albion
Having spotted him playing for junior side Tredworth Tigers at a Gloucester Festival, West Brom decided to sign Roberts for their academy when he was just seven years old. Having then gone on to represent the club at age group level, Roberts was named on West Brom's bench for the first time on the final day of the 2014–15 season against Arsenal. However, he did not make it on to the pitch. Following Roberts' inclusion in the squad, he was listed by Match of the Day magazine as one of the 20 wonder-kids to look out for in 2016. On 14 January 2016, just two days after his 17th birthday, Roberts signed his first professional contract with West Brom, putting pen to paper on a -year contract. He made his Premier League debut for the club on the final day of the 2015–16 season in a 1–1 draw with Liverpool, coming on as a second-half substitute for fellow Albion academy graduate Jonathan Leko. Shortly after coming on, Roberts was booked for a rash challenge on Liverpool captain Jordan Henderson. Upon making his debut, Roberts became only the second player born in 1999 to play in the Premier League, following on from teammate Leko who had done so the month before.

2016–2018: Loans to Oxford United, Shrewsbury Town & Walsall
On 28 July 2016, Roberts joined League One side Oxford United on a six-month loan deal until January 2017. He made his debut for the club on the opening day of the 2016–17 season, coming off the bench for Chris Maguire in a 1–1 draw with Chesterfield. His League Cup debut came the following week when he entered the field of play as an extra-time substitute in Oxford's 1–0 win over Birmingham. He then scored his first goal for the club, and the first professional goal of his career, in a 4–2 victory over League Two club Exeter City in the 2016–17 EFL Trophy on 30 August. On 5 November, Roberts made his FA Cup debut and scored in a 5–0 win over Merstham of the Isthmian League. A month later, on 6 December, he scored the winning penalty in a shootout against Southend United, after a 1–1 draw in the second round of the EFL Trophy.

Later that month, Oxford manager Michael Appleton lodged a request to West Brom to extend Roberts' loan until the end of the season. However, on 17 January 2017, Roberts joined fellow League One side Shrewsbury Town on loan until the end of the season. He made his debut for the club four days later, starting in a 1–0 league win over Oldham Athletic. Roberts scored his first goal for the club, and his first in league football, on 4 February when he netted the opener in a 2–1 win over Bury. On 4 April, Roberts suffered a hamstring injury in a 2–1 defeat to Millwall that saw his stint at Shrewsbury come to an end. He ended the campaign with four goals and two assists for the club as they narrowly avoided relegation.

On 25 August 2017, Roberts left West Brom on loan once again, joining League One side Walsall for the season. The following day, he scored one goal and assisted another on debut against Bradford City, helping Walsall come from 3–0 down to earn a 3–3 draw. He went on to score five goals in 17 appearances before being recalled by West Brom at the half-way mark of the season.

Leeds United

Transfer
Roberts' return to West Brom was short-lived, however, as the arrival of Daniel Sturridge on loan from Liverpool limited his first team chances further. As a result, on the final day of the January 2018 transfer window, he signed for Championship side Leeds United on a four-and-a-half-year deal for an undisclosed fee, believed to be around an initial £2.5 million potentially rising to £4 million depending on clauses. Having recovered from a minor knock which he arrived at the club with, Roberts looked set to make his debut in the middle of February. However, on 14 February, new club manager Paul Heckingbottom revealed that he had cracked his shin bone upon his return in training and would be ruled out for several weeks. He ultimately missed the remainder of the season through the injury.

2018–19 season
After spending several months on the sidelines, Roberts made his unofficial debut as a second-half substitute during a pre-season friendly against Southend United. His full debut followed on 14 August when he started for Leeds in an EFL Cup fixture against Bolton Wanderers. The following month, he made his league debut in a 1–1 draw with Millwall and scored his first goals for the club three days later, scoring a brace in a 3–0 victory over Preston North End. On 1 March he assisted Patrick Bamford twice in a 4–0 victory over former club West Bromwich Albion, with Roberts receiving the man of the match award playing in an attacking midfielder position.

He was one of three players nominated for the club's Young Player Of The Season award alongside Jamie Shackleton and Jack Clarke, but lost out as Clarke won the award at the club's annual ceremony.

Roberts played 32 games scoring three goals in all competitions, after Leeds finished the regular season in third place after dropping out of the automatic promotion places with three games left after a defeat to 10-man Wigan Athletic on 19 April, Leeds qualified for the playoffs, however Roberts missed the final games of the season due to injury, including missing the semi-final playoffs matches versus sixth-placed Derby County, as Leeds were beaten 4–3 on aggregate over the two legs. Despite taking a 1–0 win at Pride Park, to bring into a 1–0 aggregate lead into the home leg at Elland Road, Leeds lost 4–2 in an encounter that saw both teams reduced to 10 men and Derby progress to the final against Aston Villa.

2019–20 season
Roberts ended up missing all the 2019–20 pre-season games and the start of the new season after undergoing knee surgery during May 2019. He returned from injury against Charlton Athletic on 28 September 2019, before scoring his first goal of the season against Queens Park Rangers in a 2–0 win on 2 November 2019. However, Roberts picked up an injury against Reading on 26 November, which kept him out of the Leeds side for a month before returning from injury as a substitute in Leeds' 5–4 win against Birmingham City on 29 December 2019, but picked up a hamstring injury in the same game. The injury kept him out of the team until early February, when he returned as a second-half substitute in a 1–0 defeat at home to Wigan Athletic. On 29 February 2020, Roberts came on as a 67th-minute substitute for striker Patrick Bamford with Leeds 2–0 ahead at Hull City, before Roberts scored the last two goals of the game in his first brace of the season and his second as a Leeds player. Following the suspension of the Championship season, Roberts appeared in eight of the club's final nine games, scoring once, as they were promoted to the Premier League.

2020–21 season
Roberts made his first appearance for Leeds in the Premier League in the first match of the season against Liverpool on 12 September 2020, coming on as a substitute in the 4–3 defeat at Anfield to the reigning champions. Roberts scored his first goal of the season against Southampton on 18 May 2021, scoring after coming on as a substitute in the 2–0 win at St Mary's.

2021–22 season
On 9 June 2021, Roberts signed a new three-year deal at Elland Road running until the summer of 2024.

Roberts came on as a 76th-minute substitute for Jack Harrison during a 1–0 away defeat at Leicester on 5 March 2022 and almost immediately suffered a ruptured tendon, but continued to play for the full 90 minutes. He received surgery on the right leg immediately afterwards but did not feature in any other Leeds games for the rest of the 2021–22 season.

2022–23 season
Roberts joined Queens Park Rangers on loan for the 2022–23 season on 6 July 2022. He scored on his QPR debut in an EFL Cup tie against Charlton Athletic on 9 August 2022.

Roberts returned to Leeds United on 9 March 2023.

International career

Youth
Though he represented England, his country of birth, at schoolboy level, Roberts later decided to play for Wales instead, qualifying for selection as two of his grandparents are Welsh.

In 2015, he captained the Wales U16 side to glory in the Victory Shield, scoring in the final against Northern Ireland. The result was Wales' first outright triumph in the competition since the 1948–49 edition. Having trained with the senior side in between, he returned to the U16 side in November the following year and was part of the squad which retained the Victory Shield title.

In May 2017, following the conclusion of the League One season, he was included in Robert Page's squad for the 2017 Toulon Tournament. After making his debut for the side in the tournament opener against Ivory Coast, Roberts made one further appearance, against France, as Wales were eliminated in the group stage. On 1 September 2017, he made his debut for the under-21 side and scored the opening goal in a 3–0 victory over Switzerland.

Senior
In May 2015, Roberts, along with Liverpool winger Harry Wilson, was called up by Wales manager Chris Coleman to train with the senior squad. In March 2017 he was named as a stand-by player for Wales' World Cup qualifier against the Republic of Ireland.

He received his first full call-up in August 2018 when he was named in Ryan Giggs' squad for the nation's UEFA Nations League matches against the Republic of Ireland and Denmark. His debut followed against the former on 6 September, coming on as a second-half substitute for Gareth Bale in a 4–1 victory. The following month, on 16 October 2018, Roberts was handed his first Wales start as the Republic of Ireland were again beaten 1–0 in Dublin. In May 2021 he was selected for the Wales squad for the delayed UEFA Euro 2020 tournament.

Career statistics

Club

1 Includes EFL Trophy matches.

International
.

Honours
Leeds United
EFL Championship: 2019–20

Wales U16
Victory Shield: 2015; 2016

References

External links

1999 births
Living people
Footballers from Gloucester
Welsh footballers
Wales international footballers
Wales under-21 international footballers
Wales youth international footballers
English footballers
Welsh people of Jamaican descent
British sportspeople of Jamaican descent
English people of Welsh descent
English sportspeople of Jamaican descent
Association football forwards
Leeds United F.C. players
West Bromwich Albion F.C. players
Oxford United F.C. players
Shrewsbury Town F.C. players
Walsall F.C. players
Queens Park Rangers F.C. players
Premier League players
English Football League players
UEFA Euro 2020 players